Soil salinity is the salt content in the soil; the process of increasing the salt content is known as salinization. Salts occur naturally within soils and water. Salination can be caused by natural processes such as mineral weathering or by the gradual withdrawal of an ocean. It can also come about through artificial processes such as irrigation and road salt.

Natural occurrence
Salts are a natural component in soils and water.
The ions responsible for salination are: Na+, K+, Ca2+, Mg2+ and Cl−.

Over long periods of time, as soil minerals weather and release salts, these salts are flushed or leached out of the soil by drainage water in areas with sufficient precipitation. In addition to mineral weathering, salts are also deposited via dust and precipitation.  Salts may accumulate in dry regions, leading to naturally saline soils. This is the case, for example, in large parts of Australia. 

Human practices can increase the salinity of soils by the addition of salts in irrigation water. Proper irrigation management can prevent salt accumulation by providing adequate drainage water to leach added salts from the soil. Disrupting drainage patterns that provide leaching can also result in salt accumulations. An example of this occurred in Egypt in 1970 when the Aswan High Dam was built. The change in the level of ground water before the construction had enabled soil erosion, which led to high concentration of salts in the water table. After the construction, the continuous high level of the water table led to the salination of arable land.

Sodic soils
When the Na+ (sodium) predominates, soils can become sodic. The pH of sodic soils may be acidic, neutral or alkaline. 

Sodic soils present particular challenges because they tend to have very poor structure which limits or prevents water infiltration and drainage. They tend to accumulate certain elements like boron and molybdenum in the root zone at levels that maybe toxic for plants. The most common compound used for reclamation of sodic soil is gypsum, and some plants that are tolerant to salt and ion toxicity may present strategies for improvement.

The term "sodic soil" is sometimes used imprecisely in scholarship. It's been used interchangeably with the term alkali soil, which is used in two meanings: 1) a soil with a pH greater than 8.2, 2) a soil with an exchangeable sodium content in excess of 15% of exchange capacity. The term "alkali soil" is often, but not always, used for soils that meet both of these characteristics.

Dry land salinity
Salinity in drylands can occur when the water table is between two and three metres from the surface of the soil.  The salts from the groundwater are raised by capillary action to the surface of the soil. This occurs when groundwater is saline (which is true in many areas), and is favored by land use practices allowing more rainwater to enter the aquifer than it could accommodate. For example, the clearing of trees for agriculture is a major reason for dryland salinity in some areas, since deep rooting of trees has been replaced by shallow rooting of annual crops.

Salinity due to irrigation

Salinity from irrigation can occur over time wherever irrigation occurs, since almost all water (even natural rainfall) contains some dissolved salts. When the plants use the water, the salts are left behind in the soil and eventually begin to accumulate. This water in excess of plant needs is called the leaching fraction.  Salination from irrigation water is also greatly increased by poor drainage and use of saline water for irrigating agricultural crops.

Salinity in urban areas often results from the combination of irrigation and groundwater processes. Irrigation is also now common in cities (gardens and recreation areas).

Consequences of soil salinity
The consequences of salinity are
 Detrimental effects on plant growth and yield
 Damage to infrastructure (roads, bricks, corrosion of pipes and cables)
 Reduction of water quality for users, sedimentation problems, increased leaching of metals, especially copper, cadmium, manganese and zinc.  
 soil erosion ultimately, when crops are too strongly affected by the amounts of salts.
 More energy required to desalinate

Salinity is an important land degradation problem. Soil salinity can be reduced by leaching soluble salts out of soil with excess irrigation water.  Soil salinity control involves watertable control and flushing in combination with tile drainage or another form of subsurface drainage. A comprehensive treatment of soil salinity is available from the United Nations Food and Agriculture Organization.

Salt tolerance of crops

High levels of soil salinity can be tolerated if salt-tolerant plants are grown.  Sensitive crops lose their vigor already in slightly saline soils, most crops are negatively affected by (moderately) saline soils, and only salinity-resistant crops thrive in severely saline soils. The University of Wyoming  and the Government of Alberta  report data on the salt tolerance of plants.

Field data in irrigated lands, under farmers' conditions, are scarce, especially in developing countries. However, some on-farm surveys have been made in Egypt, India, and Pakistan. Some examples are shown in the following gallery, with crops arranged from sensitive to very tolerant. 

Calcium has been found to have a positive effect in combating salinity in soils. It has been shown to ameliorate the negative effects that salinity has such as reduced water usage of plants.

Regions affected
From the FAO/UNESCO Soil Map of the World the following salinised areas can be derived.

See also

References

External links
Article on water and salt balances in the soil
Download leaching model for saline soils
Salt of the Earth Documentary produced by Prairie Public Television

Soil science
Salts
Environmental soil science
Energy conversion
Water and the environment